Events from the year 1982 in Sweden

Incumbents
 Monarch – Carl XVI Gustaf
 Prime Minister – Thorbjörn Fälldin, Olof Palme

Events
19 September – The 1976 Swedish general election is held.
8 October – Thorbjörn Fälldin resigns as Prime Minister of Sweden, following a defeat for the Centre Party of Sweden in the Swedish parliamentary election. He is replaced with Olof Palme.

Births

 31 January – Yukimi Nagano, singer-songwriter
 2 March – Henrik Lundqvist, ice hockey player.
 10 June – Princess Madeleine, Duchess of Hälsingland and Gästrikland

Deaths
 4 January – Konrad Granström, gymnast (born 1900).
 30 January – Tora Dahl, writer (born 1886).
 10 March – Erik August Larsson, cross country skier (born 1912).
 8 June - Solveig Rönn-Christiansson, politician (born 1902).
 8 July – Gunnar Eriksson, cross country skier (born 1921).
 29 August – Ingrid Bergman, actress (born 1915).

References

 
Years of the 20th century in Sweden